Sea Venture was a seventeenth-century English sailing ship, part of the Third Supply mission to the Jamestown Colony, that was wrecked in Bermuda in 1609. She was the 300 ton purpose-built flagship of the London Company and a highly unusual vessel for her day, given that she was the first single timbered merchantman built in England, and also the first dedicated emigration ship. Sea Ventures wreck is widely thought to have been the inspiration for William Shakespeare's play The Tempest.

The Virginia Company 

The proprietary of the London Company had established the settlement of Jamestown in Virginia in 1607, and delivered supplies and additional settlers in 1608, raising the English colony's population to 200, despite many deaths. The entire operation was characterized by a lack of resources and experience. The company's fleet was composed of vessels that were less than optimal for delivering large numbers of passengers across the Atlantic Ocean, and the colony itself was threatened by starvation, diseases, and warfare with native peoples.

The colony at Jamestown seemed doomed to meet the same fate as the Roanoke Colony and the Popham Colony, two earlier failed English attempts to settle in North America, unless there was a major relief effort, despite the delivery of supplies in 1608 on the First and Second Supply missions of Captain Christopher Newport. Yet the investors of the London Company expected to reap rewards from their speculative investments. With the Second Supply, they expressed their frustrations and made demands upon the leaders of Jamestown in written form. They specifically demanded that the colonists send commodities sufficient to pay the cost of the voyage, a lump of gold, assurance that they had found the South Sea, and one member of the lost Roanoke Colony.

It fell to the third president of the council to deliver a reply. Ever bold, Captain John Smith delivered what must have been a wake-up call to the investors in London. In what has been termed "Smith's Rude Answer", he composed a letter, writing (in part):

Smith did begin his letter with something of an apology, saying "I humbly intreat your Pardons if I offend you with my rude Answer".

There are strong indications that those in London comprehended and embraced Smith's message. Their Third Supply mission was by far the largest and best equipped. They even had the newly constructed purpose-built flagship Sea Venture placed in the most experienced hands of Christopher Newport.

Construction
The Company built Sea Venture, probably in Aldeburgh, as England's first purpose-designed emigrant ship and in response to the inadequacy of its vessels. She measured "300 tunnes", cost £1,500, and differed from her contemporaries primarily in her internal arrangements. Her guns were placed on her main deck, rather than below decks as was then the norm. This meant that the ship did not need double-timbering, and she may have been the first single-timbered, armed merchant ship built in England. The hold was sheathed and furnished for passengers. She was armed with eight  demi-culverins, eight  sakers, four  falcons, and four arquebuses. The ship was launched in 1609, and her uncompleted journey to Jamestown appears to have been her maiden voyage.

Loss
On 2 June 1609, Sea Venture set sail from Plymouth, England as the flagship of a seven-ship fleet (towing two additional pinnaces) destined for Jamestown, Virginia as part of the Third Supply, carrying 500 to 600 people (it is unclear whether that number includes crew, or only settlers). Normally, ships destined for North America from Europe sailed south as far as the Canary Islands as at that latitude the mean direction of the wind is to the West, pushing them across the Atlantic (ships returning to Europe turned eastward at the Carolinas, as at that latitude the mean wind direction is to the East), then followed the chain of west Indian islands to Florida and from there followed the Atlantic coast of the continent. However, with the West Indies firmly in the grip of the Spanish Empire, the English fleet turned Northwards in the open Atlantic, intending to bypass the Spanish threat and head directly for Virginia. Days away from Jamestown, on 24 July, the fleet ran into a strong storm, likely a hurricane, and the ships were separated. A pinnace, Catch, went down with all aboard lost. Sea Venture however, fought the storm for three days. Comparably sized ships had survived such weather, but Sea Venture had a critical flaw in her newness: her timbers had not set. The caulking was forced from between them, and the ship began to leak rapidly. All hands were applied to bailing, but water continued to rise in the hold.

The ship's starboard-side guns were reportedly jettisoned to raise her buoyancy, but this only delayed the inevitable. The Admiral of the Company himself, Sir George Somers, was at the helm through the storm. Somers deliberately had the ship driven onto the reefs of Discovery Bay, in what later proved to be eastern Bermuda, in order to prevent its foundering. This allowed 150 people, and one dog, to be landed safely ashore (the total number of human passengers and crew is variously given as 150, though the account of survivor William Strachey appears to list 153: In it were two Knights, Sir Thomas Gates, Knight Gouernor of the English Forces and Colonie there : and Sir George Summers Knight, Admirall of the Seas. Her Captaine was Christopher Newport, Passengers and Mariners, shee had beside (which came all safe to Land) one hundred and fiftie), The survivors, including several company officials (Lieutenant-General Sir Thomas Gates, the ship's captain Christopher Newport, Samuel Jordan, Sylvester Jordain, Stephen Hopkins, later of Mayflower, and secretary William Strachey), the Powhatan emissary Namontack and his companion, Machumps, were stranded on Bermuda for approximately nine months.

Deliverance and Patience

The settlers were unwilling to move on, having now heard about the true conditions in Jamestown from the sailors, and made multiple attempts to rebel and stay in Bermuda. They argued, as the Mayflower passengers later argued, that they had been freed from their contract by the hurricane and shipwreck, and could now choose their own government. Governor Gates suppressed escape attempts, and the new settlement became a prison labour camp, with settlers forced to build ships to carry them away against their wills.

During the time on Bermuda, the survivors constructed two new ships, the pinnaces Deliverance and Patience, from local Bermuda cedar, which was a wood especially prized by regional ship builders because it was as strong as oak, yet lighter. This misnamed juniper species could be worked with immediately after felling, and it has high resistance to rot and wood worms. Materials salvaged from the beached wreck were also used, especially her rigging. They were constructed between late fall 1609 and early spring 1610 under the guidance of Admiral Somers and James Davis, Captain of the "Gift of God" who possessed considerable ship building knowledge. These ships represented the second and third pinnaces built in the English colonies in the Americas, the first being the 1607–08 construction of Virginia at the Popham Colony in New England.

The original plan was to build only one vessel, Deliverance, but it soon became evident that she would not be large enough to carry the settlers and all of the food that was being sourced on the islands. The Deliverance was constructed under the direction of carpenter Richard Frobisher on St. George's Island, not far from Gates' Bay, at what is still known as Building Bay. The Patience is generally believed to have been built on the Main Island at Walsingham Bay, in the area known as Walsingham (said to be named after the coxswain of the Sea Venture, Robert Walsingham) on the western shore of Castle Harbour, which is today part of the Parish of Hamilton. Bermudian teacher and Lieutenant-Commander Royal Naval Reserve (Sea Cadet Corps) Dr. Derek Tully, however, has suggested St. David's Island as the construction site. In Stratchey's account:

While the new ships were being built, Sea Ventures longboat was fitted with a mast and sent under the command of Henry Ravens to find Virginia, but the boat and its crew were never seen again. Finally, under the command of Newport, the two ships with 142 survivors (of the 153 mariners and passengers Strachey reported surviving the wreck - Gates, Somers, Newport, and 150 others - those who died in Bermuda were: Mrs Rolfe, the wife of John Rolfe; Edward Samuell, the sailor killed by Waters; Richard Lewis; William Hitchman; Jeffery Briars; and Henry Paine, who had been executed by firing squad. The Powhattan emissary Namontack had vanished while on a hunting expedition with Machumps and his fate was never discovered. Henry Ravens had been sent to Jamestown in command of the Sea Venture's longboat, fitted out for the ocean voyage, along with cape merchant Thomas Whittingham and 6 unidentified sailors; they returned several days later, having been unable to find a passage through Bermuda's reefline onto the open Atlantic, then set out for another attempt and were never heard of again. Two children were born in Bermuda: the daughter of the Rolfes, Bermuda Rolfe, who died and was buried in Bermuda; and Bermudas Eason, the son of Edward Eason and his wife. Minus Carter and Waters, this would give a figure of 137 passengers and crew that continued to Jamestown aboard the Deliverance and Patience, including one child born in Bermuda after the wreck of the Sea Venture) set sail for Virginia on 10 May 1610, and arrived at the Jamestown settlement on the 23rd, a journey of less than two weeks. Two sailors, Christopher Carter and Edward Waters (whom some records name Robert Waters), remained behind; Waters faced possible trial for the killing of another sailor and had fled into the forest. Carter, like many others of the settlers and crew, did not wish to leave Bermuda and had joined Waters in the forest to avoid being compelled to leave.

On reaching Jamestown, only 60 survivors were found of the 500 or so who had preceded them. Many of these were themselves dying, and Jamestown was quickly judged to be nonviable. Everyone then boarded Virginia, Deliverance, and Patience, which set sail for England. The timely arrival of another relief fleet, bearing Governor Baron De La Warre, granted Jamestown a reprieve. All the settlers were relanded at the colony, but there was still a critical shortage of food. In the fall of 1610, Admiral Somers returned to Bermuda in Patience to obtain wild pigs and food that had been stockpiled there. Unfortunately, Somers died in Bermuda from a "surfeit of pork" and the pinnace, captained by his nephew Mathew Somers, returned directly to Lyme Regis in Dorset, England with the body in order to claim his inheritance. Christopher Carter and Edward Waters, who evidently had been forgiven their earlier desertion, remained behind in Bermuda, again, joined by Edward Chard, the first permanent settlers of Bermuda (Christopher Carter and Edward Waters were to be among the Counsell of Six appointed to advise the first Lieutenant-Governor of Bermuda, Richard Moore, in 1612, and amongst whom the Lieutenant-Governorship was rotated during the period in 1616 between the departure of Moore and the arrival of his successor). Overall, the food and supplies brought by the Third Supply were not adequate. 80% of the colonists would die during the Starving Time of 1610. Afterwards, survivors at Jamestown had boarded Deliverance and Patience and were sailing downstream to the ocean when they met yet another resupply fleet. Lord Delaware was this expedition's leader and he turned the distraught settlers back. He had brought a doctor but food supplies remained inadequate.

Wreck

Sea Venture sat atop the reefs off Gate's Bay long enough to be stripped of all useful parts and materials, not only by her crew and passengers, but by subsequent settlers; what was left of her eventually disappeared beneath the waves. Two of her guns were salvaged in 1612 and used in the initial fortification of Bermuda (one was placed on Governor's Island, opposite Paget's Fort, the other on Castle Island). After the wreck's submergence, her precise location was unknown until rediscovered by sport divers Downing and Heird in October 1958, still wedged into a coral reef. There was little left of the ship or its cargo. Despite the lack of artifacts to be found, she was positively identified in 1959, in time for the 350th anniversary of the wrecking. Subsequent research uncovered one gun and cannonball, along with shot for small arms. There were also some Spanish jars, stoneware from Germany and ceramics and cooking pots much like what had been found excavating Jamestown.

In writing
 The wrecking is believed to have inspired William Shakespeare's The Tempest. This tradition has been confirmed by a detailed comparison to survivors' narratives such as Sylvester Jordain, and that of historian and author William Strachey, who wrote an account of the storm entitled True Reportory of the Wrack, and Redemption of Sir Thomas Gates Knight, was the primary source Shakespeare drew upon.
 The Three Kings Of Bermuda & Their Treasure Of Ambergris, by Washington Irving. 1840.
 Bermuda resident and novelist, F. Van Wyck Mason, wrote a fictionalised account of the wrecking, The Sea 'Venture, first published in 1961.
 20th-century American author Scott O'Dell wrote and published a fictionalized account of Sea Venture shipwreck called The Serpent Never Sleeps.
 Children's author Clyde Robert Bulla wrote a fictionalized account of Sea Venture voyage called A Lion to Guard Us. It focuses on three children sailing to Jamestown to find their father.
 Sea Venture was also the namesake of a cruise liner which operated between the US and Bermuda in the 1970s for Flagship Cruises, before being obtained by Princess Cruises, which renamed her Pacific Princess, which was subsequently used in the television show The Love Boat.

See also
 Jamestown supply missions -Third supply mission
 The Virginia Company
 Somers Isles Company
 History of Bermuda
 Colony and Dominion of Virginia
 History of Virginia

Notes

References

Bibliography

Further reading

 
 
 
 
 
 
Strachey, William. "The True Reportory of the Wracke and Redemption of Sir Thomas Gates" (f.p. 1625) in A Voyage to Virginia in 1609, Louis B. Wright, ed. (1965), 1-101.

External links
  – Ship Passenger and Immigration Lists
 
 
 
  – Packrat Pilgrim Ship Lists - the Sea Venture

Age of Sail ships of England
Colony of Virginia
History of Bermuda
Maritime incidents in 1609
Shipwrecks of Bermuda
Virginia Company
The Tempest